The Agmark Rabaul Gurias are a semi professional Papua New Guinean rugby league team from Kokopo, East New Britain Province . They currently compete in the Papua New Guinea National Rugby League Competition. They play their home games at Kalabond Oval at the foot of active volcano Tavurvur. The Franchise is owned by NGIP Agmark Limited and was founded in 1991. The team has won six premierships in 2001, 2003, 2005, 2009, 2012 and 2015. The team has been a competitive team in the semi professional rugby game in Papua New Guinea over the past years and the team has developed professional rugby players who have played for the PNG Hunters like Israel Eliab, Ase Boas, Watson Boas and Wartovo Puara Jr. Former greats include Kumul strongman Lucas Solbat, Michael Marum, Normyle Eremas and  Menzie Yere.

2022 squad

See also

References

External links

Papua New Guinean rugby league teams
Rugby league in Papua New Guinea
Papua New Guinea National Rugby League